Neville Augustus Jessopp (31 July 1898 – 13 July 1977) was an English first-class cricketer.

Jessopp was born at Sleaford, Lincolnshire and was educated at Harrow School. He left Harrow in 1916 and went straight into the British Army for service in the First World War, serving as a second lieutenant in the Royal Horse Guards. He resigned his commission shortly after the war, on account of ill health. He made two appearances in first-class cricket for the Marylebone Cricket Club in 1919, playing against the Australian Imperial Forces and Oxford University. He took 7 wickets in these two matches with his left-arm fast-medium bowling, with best figures of 3 for 64. In addition to playing first-class cricket, Jessopp also played minor counties cricket for Norfolk. He debuted before the war in 1914, before making five further appearances in the Minor Counties Championship in 1920. He later emigrated to British East Africa, where he became a farmer. He moved to South Africa later in life, where he died at Claremont, Cape Province.

References

External links

1898 births
1977 deaths
People from Sleaford, Lincolnshire
People educated at Harrow School
English cricketers
Norfolk cricketers
British Army personnel of World War I
Royal Horse Guards officers
Marylebone Cricket Club cricketers
English emigrants to Kenya
English farmers
English emigrants to South Africa